Naft Al-Shamal Sport Club, is an Iraqi football team based in Kirkuk, that plays in the Iraq Division Three.

History
The original Sharikat Naft Al-Shamal team (Northern Oil Company) was established in 1948, and its name was later changed to Al-Amaliyat Al-Naftiya Al-Mahdouda. Naft Al-Shamal SC was founded in 1977, and its name was later changed to Wahid Huzairan. In 2017, it returned to the name Naft Al-Shamal.

In addition to the fact that the club has a team that plays in the Iraq Division Three, it also has another team that plays in the Kurdistan Premier League.

Honours

Women's team
Iraqi Women's Football League
Winners (1): 2020–21

Managerial history
 Ahmed Habib

See also 
 2021–22 Iraq FA Cup

References

External links
 Naft Al-Shamal SC on Goalzz.com
 Iraq Clubs- Foundation Dates

1977 establishments in Iraq
Association football clubs established in 1977
Football clubs in Kirkuk